This is a list of player transfers involving Pro12 teams before or during the 2016–17 season.

Benetton Treviso

Players In 
 Andrea Buondonno from  Mogliano
 David Odiete from  Mogliano
 Ian McKinley from  Viadana
 Guglielmo Zanini from  Rovigo Delta
 Giorgio Bronzini from  Rovigo Delta
 Tito Tebaldi from  Harlequins
 Nicola Quaglio from  Rovigo Delta
 Michael Tagicakibau from  Scarlets
 Filippo Gerosa from  Viadana
 Tiziano Pasquali from  Leicester Tigers
 Tommaso Allan from  USA Perpignan
 Tommaso Benvenuti from  Bristol Rugby
 Federico Zani from  Mogliano
 Luca Sperandio from  Mogliano

Players Out
 Matteo Muccignat to  Rovigo Delta
 Ludovico Nitoglia retired
 Enrico Bacchin to  Petrarca Padova
 Simone Ragusi to  Petrarca Padova
 Alberto Lucchese retired
 Salesi Manu to  Honda Heat
 Andrea De Marchi to  Rovigo Delta
 Duncan Naude to  Limoges
 Sam Christie to  Waikato
 James Ambrosini to  Amatori San Donà
 Chris Smylie to  North Harbour
 Rupert Harden to  Richmond
 Tom Palmer to  Bordeaux Begles

Cardiff Blues

Players In
 Nick Williams from  Ulster
 Matthew Morgan from  Bristol Rugby
 Rhys Gill from  Saracens
 Steven Shingler from  Scarlets
 Willis Halaholo from  Hurricanes
 Kirby Myhill from  Scarlets
 George Earle from  Scarlets

Players Out
 Rhys Patchell to  Scarlets
 Sam Hobbs to  Newport Gwent Dragons
 Craig Mitchell to  Newport Gwent Dragons 
 Chris Dicomidis to  Pontypridd
 Tom Williams to  Scarlets
 Miles Normandale to  Rotherham Titans
 Harry Davies to  Bath
 Gavin Evans to  Neath RFC
 Manoa Vosawai to  RC Vannes
 Lou Reed to  Sale Sharks
 Richard Smith to  Scarlets
 Tom Isaacs to  Hong Kong Football Club
 Tom Davies to  Newport Gwent Dragons
 Joe Jones to  USA Perpignan
 Elias Wyn Benham to  Cardiff RFC
 Gareth Davies to  Merthyr RFC
 Tavis Knoyle to  Newport Gwent Dragons
 Salesi Ma'afu to  Gloucester Rugby

Connacht

Players In
 Eoin Griffin from  London Irish 
 Conor Carey from  Nottingham
 Marnitz Boshoff from  Lions
 Cian Kelleher from  Leinster
 Dominic Robertson-McCoy from  Northland
 Josh Rowland from  Ireland Sevens
 Lewis Stevenson from  Exeter Chiefs
 Stacey Ili from  Auckland
 James Cannon from  Wasps
 Ivan Soroka from  Clontarf
 Naulia Dawai from  Otago
 John Andress from  Munster
 Tom Farrell from  Bedford Blues
 Steve Crosbie from  Munster
 Peter McCabe from  Munster (loan)

Players Out
 Rodney Ah You to  Ulster
 Robbie Henshaw to  Leinster
 AJ MacGinty to  Sale Sharks
 Aly Muldowney to  Grenoble
 Api Pewhairangi to  London Broncos
 George Naoupu to  Harlequins
 Jason Harris-Wright to  London Irish
 Ian Porter to  Banbridge
 Fionn Carr to  Naas
 Conor Finn to  Buccaneers
 Dave McSharry retired
 Nathan White retired

Edinburgh

Players In
 Duncan Weir from  Glasgow Warriors
 Rory Scholes from  Ulster
 Glenn Bryce from  Glasgow Warriors
 Junior Rasolea from  Western Force
 Kevin Bryce from  Glasgow Warriors
 Nick Beavon from  Melrose RFC
 Jason Tovey from  Newport Gwent Dragons
 Alex Northam from  North Harbour Rays
 Sasa Tofilau from  Kirkcaldy RFC
 Lewis Carmichael from  Melrose RFC
 Viliami Fihaki from  Sale Sharks
 Viliame Mata from  Fiji Sevens

Players Out
 Matt Scott to  Gloucester Rugby
 Mike Coman to  London Irish
 Sam Beard to  Newport Gwent Dragons
 Greig Tonks to  London Irish
 John Andress to   Munster
 Jack Cuthbert to  Jersey Reds
 Andries Strauss retired
 Nick McLennan to  Scotland Sevens
 Grant Shiells to  London Scottish
 Alex Toolis to  Melbourne Rebels
 Jade Te Rure to  Manawatu

Glasgow Warriors

Players In
 Jarrod Firth from  Counties Manukau
 Corey Flynn from  Toulouse
 Leonardo Sarto from  Zebre
 Rory Clegg from  Oyonnax
 Nemia Kenatale from  Farul Constanța
 Tjiuee Uanivi from  Sharks
 Djustice Sears-Duru from  Ontario Blues
 Hagen Schulte from  Canterbury
 Langilangi Haupeakui from  Sacramento Express

Players Out
 Duncan Weir to  Edinburgh Rugby
 Glenn Bryce to  Edinburgh Rugby
 Robbie Fergusson to  London Scottish
 Mike Blair retired
 James Eddie retired
 Kevin Bryce to  Edinburgh Rugby
 Leone Nakarawa to  Racing 92
 Jason Hill to  Bedford Blues
 Taqele Naiyaravoro to  NSW Waratahs
 Michael Cusack to  Yorkshire Carnegie
 Gregor Hunter to  Gala RFC
 Fergus Scott to  Currie RFC
 Will Bordill to  Ayr RFC
 Tyrone Holmes to  Newcastle Falcons
 Javan Sebastian to  Carmarthen Quins
 Shalva Mamukashvili to  Montpellier
 Jerry Yanuyanutawa released

Leinster

Players In
 Robbie Henshaw from  Connacht
 Ian Nagle from  London Irish
 Jamison Gibson-Park from  Hurricanes

Players Out
 Ben Te'o to  Worcester Warriors
 Ian Madigan to  Bordeaux Begles
 Marty Moore  to  Wasps
 Darragh Fanning retired
 Cian Kelleher to  Connacht
 Tom Farrell to  Bedford Blues
 Tom Denton to  Gloucester Rugby
 Isaac Boss to  Waikato
 Tadhg Beirne to  Scarlets
 Eoin Reddan retired
 Luke Fitzgerald retired
 Aaron Dundon retired
 Mick McGrath to  Ireland Sevens
 Royce Burke-Flynn released
 Kevin McLaughlin retired
 Collie O'Shea to  Munster
 Steve Crosbie to  Wanganui
 Tony Ryan released
 Niall Morris retired

Munster

Players In
 Sammy Arnold from  Ulster
 John Andress from  Edinburgh Rugby
 Darren O'Shea from  Worcester Warriors
 Jean Kleyn from  Stormers
 Jaco Taute from  Stormers / 
 Collie O'Shea from  Leinster
 Steve Crosbie from  Wanganui
 Rhys Marshall from  Chiefs
 Thomas du Toit from  Sharks
 Jean Deysel from  Sharks

Players Out
 Jordan Coghlan to  Nottingham
 Gearoid Lyons to  Nottingham
 Shane Buckley to  Nottingham
 Jack Cullen to  London Scottish
 BJ Botha to  Lyon
 Johnny Holland retired
 Denis Hurley to  Dolphin RFC
 Gerhard van den Heever to  Yamaha Jubilo
 John Andress to  Connacht
 Steve Crosbie to  Connacht
 Peter McCabe to  Connacht (loan)

Newport Gwent Dragons

Players In
 Sam Hobbs from  Cardiff Blues 
 Sam Beard from  Edinburgh Rugby 
 Nick Macleod from  Sale Sharks
 Craig Mitchell from  Cardiff Blues
 Patrick Howard from  Northampton Saints
 Darran Harris from  Rotherham Titans
 Tom Davies from  Cardiff Blues
 Ashley Sweet from  Ebbw Vale
 Tavis Knoyle from  Cardiff Blues

Players Out
 Taulupe Faletau to  Bath Rugby
 Matthew Pewtner retired
 Hugh Gustafson to  Ospreys
 Jason Tovey  to  Edinburgh Rugby
 Andrew Coombs retired
 Aled Brew to  Bath Rugby

Ospreys

Players In
 Rhodri Jones from  Scarlets
 Hugh Gustafson from  Newport Gwent Dragons
 Kieron Fonotia from  Crusaders
 Bradley Davies from  Wasps

Players Out
 Aaron Jarvis to  Clermont Auvergne 
 Kristian Phillips to  London Welsh
 Marc Thomas to  Jersey Reds
 Ifereimi Boladau to  London Scottish
 Rynier Bernardo to  Scarlets
 Ryan Bevington to  Bristol Rugby
 Matthew Dwyer to  Merthyr RFC
 Jordan Collier to  Neath RFC
 Richard Fussell retired
 Rhodri Hughes to  Swansea RFC
 JJ Engelbrecht released
 Lloyd Evans released
 Aled Jenkins released
 Gareth Delve released

Scarlets

Players In
 Jonathan Davies from  Clermont Auvergne
 Rhys Patchell from  Cardiff Blues
 Werner Kruger from  Bulls
 Jonathan Evans from  Bath Rugby
 Johnny McNicholl from  Crusaders
 Tom Williams from  Cardiff Blues
 Rynier Bernardo from  Ospreys
 Tadhg Beirne from  Leinster
 Richard Smith from  Cardiff Blues
 Nicky Thomas from  Gloucester Rugby

Players Out
 Rhodri Williams to  Bristol Rugby
 Rhodri Jones to  Ospreys
 Steven Shingler to  Cardiff Blues 
 Maselino Paulino to  Lyon 
 George Earle to  Cardiff Blues
 Kirby Myhill to  Cardiff Blues
 Jordan Williams to  Bristol Rugby
 Harry Robinson retired
 Kieran Hardy to  Jersey Reds
 Regan King to  Jersey Reds  
 Michael Tagicakibau to  Benetton Treviso
 Josh Lewis to  Ebbw Vale
 Ben Leung to  Cardiff RFC
 Connor Lloyd to  Carmarthen Quins
 Jack Jones to   Llanelli RFC
 Torin Myhill to  Carmarthen Quins
 Michael Collins to  Otago
 Jack Payne to  Llanelli RFC
 Phil John released

Ulster

Players In
 Charles Piutau from  Wasps
 Rodney Ah You from  Connacht
 Kieran Treadwell from  Harlequins
 Marcell Coetzee from  Sharks
 Brett Herron from  Bath Rugby
 Angus Lloyd from  Trinity College Dublin
 Anton Peikrishvili from  CA Brive

Players Out
 Nick Williams to  Cardiff Blues
 Sammy Arnold to  Munster
 Rory Scholes to  Edinburgh Rugby
 Ian Humphreys retired
 Dan Tuohy to  Bristol Rugby
 Willie Faloon released 
 Paul Jackson released 
 Ruaidhri Murphy released 
 Bronson Ross released 
 Paul Rowley released 
 Frank Taggart released 
 Sam Windsor released

Zebre

Players In
 Gabriele Di Giulio from  Calvisano
 Mattia Bellini from  Petrarca Padova
 Tommaso Castello from  Calvisano
 Maxime Mbanda from  Calvisano
 Kurt Baker from  New Zealand Sevens
 Joshua Furno from  Newcastle Falcons
 Carlo Festuccia from  Wasps
 Giovanbattista Venditti from  Newcastle Falcons
 Lloyd Greeff from  Golden Lions
 Derick Minnie from  Golden Lions
 Bart le Roux from  Leopards
 Carlo Engelbrecht from  Blue Bulls
 Serafin Bordoli from  Olivos Rugby Club
 Faialaga Afamasaga from  Northland

Players Out
 Leonardo Sarto to  Glasgow Warriors
 Mirco Bergamasco to  Sacramento Express
 Filippo Ferrarini to  Ohio Aviators
 Mils Muliaina to  San Diego Breakers
 Marco Bortolami retired
 Emiliano Caffini to  Fiamme Oro
 Filippo Cristiano to  Fiamme Oro
 Kelly Haimona to  Bay of Plenty
 Giulio Toniolatti to  Lazio
 Jean Cook to  Kintetsu Liners
 Michele Visentin to  Mogliano
 Paul Derbyshire to  Amatori San Donà
 Emiliano Coria to  Nevers
 Gonzalo Garcia to  Cahors
 Ulrich Beyers to  Blue Bulls
 Luke Burgess retired
 Bruno Mercanti to  Valladolid RAC

See also
List of 2016–17 Premiership Rugby transfers
List of 2016–17 RFU Championship transfers
List of 2016–17 Super Rugby transfers
List of 2016–17 Top 14 transfers

References

2016–17 Pro12
2016-17